Millmerran Downs is a locality in the Toowoomba Region, Queensland, Australia.

Geography 
The Gore Highway forms the northern boundary of the locality.

Millmerran Downs is a rural residential area with large acreage properties.

History 
The locality name is derived from the nearby town of Millmerran, which in turn is derived from Aboriginal words in the Gooneburra language with meel meaning eye and merran meaning lookout.

Education 
There are no schools in Millmerran Downs. The nearest primary and secondary school to Year 10 is in Millmerran and the nearest secondary school to Year 12 in is Pittsworth.

References 

Toowoomba Region
Localities in Queensland